Vera Hartegg (28 May 1902 – 1 October 1981) was a German writer, stage and film actress. She was the daughter of the famous writer, diplomat, secret councilor and impostor Ernst von Hesse-Wartegg and his long-time mistress, actress Elvira Weiss (stage name Ella Kobold). The fact that she was Hesse-Wartegg's only child was only revealed through intensive research by a journalist in 2012. Hartegg hadn't mentioned her parents' names in her autobiography, which was a bestseller in Germany during the 1960s and 1970s with numerous editions.

Selected filmography
 All Because of the Dog (1935)
 By a Silken Thread (1938)
 The Woman at the Crossroads (1938)
 A Woman Like You (1939)
 Liberated Hands (1939)
 The Fire Devil (1940)
 Wunschkonzert (1940)

Books
 Es ist nicht gelogen. Der Roman einer Schauspielerin. ("It is Not a Lie. An Actress' Novel.") Berlin 1938. Autobiographical Novel.
 Warum. ("Why.") Berlin 1940. Novel
 Oriane. Berlin 1941. Novel
 Ein Glücksrad dreht sich in Paris. ("A Wheel of Fortune Spins in Paris." Comedy in three acts, stage work) 1953. TV-movie 1958.
 Drei Väter und ich armes Kind. ("Three Fathers and me Poor Child") Munich 1961. (Autobiography pt. 1)
 Vornehmstes Haus am Platze. Lulus Memoiren. ("Most Noble House in the Llace. Lulu's Memoir.") München 1964. (Autobiography pt. 2)
 Kleine Formen. ("Small Forms." Poems) Berlin 1974.

References

Bibliography 
 Giesen, Rolf.  Nazi Propaganda Films: A History and Filmography. McFarland, 2003.
 Andreas Dutz, Elisabeth Dutz: Ernst von Hesse-Wartegg (1851-1918). Reiseschriftsteller, Wissenschaftler, Lebemann. Vienna 2017 (with a short biography about his daughter Vera Hartegg)

External links 
 

1902 births
1981 deaths
Actors from Strasbourg
German film actresses
German stage actresses
Alsatian people
Writers from Strasbourg